Tom or Thomas Myers may refer to:

 Tom Myers (politician) (1872–1949), member of the British House of Commons for Spen Valley 1920–1922
 Tom Myers (safety) (born 1950), American football safety who played for ten seasons in the National Football League for the New Orleans Saints
 Tom Myers (quarterback) (born 1943), American football quarterback who played for two seasons in the National Football League for the Detroit Lions
 Tom Myers (sound engineer), American sound engineer
 Tommy Myers (1901–1944), American football player
 Thomas Myers (1774–1834), English mathematician and geographer
 Thomas Myers (MP), English member of parliament